Sheila McCarthy (born January 1, 1956) is a Canadian actress and singer. She has worked in film, television, and on stage. McCarthy is one of Canada's most honoured actors, having won two Genie Awards (film), two Gemini Awards (television), an ACTRA Award, and two Dora Awards (theatre), along with multiple nominations.

Early life 

McCarthy was born in Toronto, Ontario. She attended Thornlea Secondary School in Thornhill in her youth. Her first appearance on stage was at Toronto's Elgin Theatre in Peter Pan when she was age 6. She later attended the University of Victoria and spent a year studying with Uta Hagen at her HB Studio in New York City, and also workshopped with the Second City troupe in Toronto.

Career 

After several years of television work under her belt, McCarthy secured a role in the made-for-television movie A Nest of Singing Birds (1987), receiving early recognition for her talent with a Gemini Award nomination for Best Performance by a Lead Actress in a Dramatic Program. That year, she made her first notable impression on the Canadian movie scene as Polly, the quirky, "organizationally impaired girl" in Patricia Rozema's I've Heard the Mermaids Singing. For this role, McCarthy won the Genie Award for Best Actress. The film became wildly popular in Canada, earning many international and domestic awards and critical acclaim.

McCarthy has since become one of Canada's more honoured actors, having won two Genie Awards (film), two Gemini Awards (television), and two Dora Awards (theatre) along with multiple nominations.

She played Sarah Hamoudi in the Canadian television series Little Mosque on the Prairie (2007-2012), a role for which she was nominated for a Gemini award. One of her more recognized big-screen roles is Samantha, the news reporter in the movie Die Hard 2 with Bruce Willis. Her most recent roles are Connie Hendrix, mother of the clone Alison in series Orphan Black and Agnes Rofa in the series The Umbrella Academy.

She is also an accomplished voice-over actress, having performed characters voices in Free Willy, Mythic Warriors: Guardians of the Legend, The Busy World of Richard Scarry, The Neverending Story, Bad Dog and Marvin the Tap-Dancing Horse.

On stage, McCarthy has appeared in Little Shop of Horrors, Hamlet, Cabaret, Guys and Dolls, Anything Goes and Love Letters.

Personal life 

McCarthy was married to actor Peter Donaldson, who died January 8, 2011 two years after being diagnosed with cancer. They had two daughters, Drew and Mackenzie Donaldson, who is also in show business (producer of Whatever, Linda and Orphan Black).

Sheila McCarthy is active as a spokesperson for The Quilt Project, a support group for families affected by breast cancer, and Canadian Feed the Children.

Filmography

Discography
 2006: "All Good Now" – from the movie Cow Belles

Awards and nominations

This section needs to be expanded to include further awards and nominations.

Notes
a. Some sources say the 27th

References

External links

1956 births
Actresses from Toronto
Canadian film actresses
Canadian stage actresses
Canadian television actresses
Canadian voice actresses
Best Actress Genie and Canadian Screen Award winners
Living people
Best Actress in a Drama Series Canadian Screen Award winners